Four-time defending champions Diede de Groot and Aniek van Koot defeated Yui Kamiji and Kgothatso Montjane in the final, 7–6(7–5), 1–6, [10–8] to win the women's doubles wheelchair tennis title at the 2022 French Open.

Seeds

Draw

Finals

References

External Links
 Draw

Wheelchair Women's Doubles
French Open, 2022 Women's Doubles